A stichting is a Dutch legal entity with limited liability, but no members or share capital, that exists for a specific purpose. This form of entity makes it possible to separate functions of ownership and control. Its use has been pioneered successfully in recent years as a 'poison pill' style defence tactic in hostile takeover situations by Scott V Simpson, one of Europe's leading mergers and acquisitions lawyers.

Formation
A stichting is a legal person created through a legal act. This act is usually either a notarised deed (or a will) that contains the articles of the foundation which must include the first appointed board. No government authority is involved in the creation or authorization of a foundation. It acquires full legal capacity through its sole creation. A foundation has no members and its purpose must be stated in its articles, using capital dedicated to such goal. The foundations are defined in the Dutch Civil Code (Burgerlijk Wetboek), Boek 2 Art 285-304. It is not necessary in the Netherlands that a foundation serves a purpose of general interest, but its official goal cannot include making payments to anybody, except for charitable causes. A foundation is governed and represented by a board that is responsible for the foundation's administration. The board does not have a requirement for specific number of members.

Art. 2:289 of the Civil Code establishes that all foundations must be registered in the Register of Commerce or "Kamer van Koophandel". Commercial activities are allowed if they are within the purpose of the foundation and are taxed. Board members can be held liable for the foundation, civilly as well as criminally.

The Dutch Tax Service can declare an institution to be an "institution for general benefit" (ANBI), with tax benefits. Often, but not necessarily, this is a foundation. Conversely, not every foundation qualifies.

Examples

Charitable organizations
Cornelis Kruseman Stichting – purpose: bring the work of painter Cornelis Kruseman (1797–1857) to the attention of the public.
Stichting Museumjaarkaart – purpose: promote visits to Dutch museums.
Nederlandse Omroep Stichting – purpose: make news and sports programmes for the three Dutch public television channels and the Dutch public radio services.
Stichting FERN – purpose: promote greater environmental and social justice, focusing on forests and forest peoples’ rights.
Stichting INGKA Foundation – purpose: promote and support innovation in the field of architectural and interior design.
Stichting Max Havelaar – purpose: the Dutch member of Fairtrade International.
Stichting Pensioenfonds ABP – pension fund for the government and educational sectors.
Stichting Pensioenfonds Zorg en Welzijn – pension fund for the healthcare and social work sectors.
Wiardi Beckman Stichting – purpose: a think tank linked to the Labour Party (PvdA).
Mars One – purpose: establish a permanent human colony on Mars.
MINIX 3 – Stichting MINIX Research Foundation - purpose: Support and develop Minix3 Operating System.
Urgenda – Foundation who won the State of the Netherlands v. Urgenda Foundation case at the Netherlands Supreme Court
Stichting van Warnborough - Foundation for Education - empowering people and communities.

Takeover defense
Stichtingen (Dutch plural form) are used as a type of poison pill (takeover defense mechanism) for publicly traded companies. In one case, the Dutch-incorporated pharmaceutical company Mylan established a stichting for the purpose of "safeguarding Mylan’s strategy, mission and independence" and gave the stichting the right to veto any proposed hostile takeover of Mylan. The stichting was activated in July 2015 to block a planned takeover by Teva Pharmaceutical Industries.

Finance and investment
Stichtingen are used by institutional investors, such as banks and wealthy individuals, as a means of controlling assets while not having legal ownership or consolidating the assets on their financial statements. The properties of a stichting can be used to avoid inheritance tax, trade sanctions and expropriation. In one case, the Libyan-based oil company Oilinvest used a stichting structure to avoid sanctions on Libya and ensure its continued operation following the overthrow of Muammar Gaddafi; in another case, the Russian oil company Yukos used a stichting structure in an attempt to shield its assets from tax claims by the Russian government.

Netherlands Antilles
Foundation legislation was last reformed in 1998, giving rise to the Netherlands Antilles Private Foundation (Stichting Particulier Fonds).

See also
Naamloze vennootschap
Besloten vennootschap
Private foundation

References

Business in the Netherlands
Foundations based in the Netherlands

nl:Stichting